Salomon Landolt (10 December 1741– 26 November 1818) was a Swiss painter.

References

18th-century Swiss painters
18th-century Swiss male artists
Swiss male painters
19th-century Swiss painters
1741 births
1818 deaths
19th-century Swiss male artists